National Guideline Clearinghouse (NGC) is a database of evidence-based clinical practice guidelines and related documents. As of July 2, 2018, it will no longer be updated with new content, and it will no longer be available online as of July 18, 2018. As stated on its announcement page on June 18, 2018, federal funding is no longer available for it (nor for the National Quality Measures Clearinghouse [NQMC]) The entire content of the NGC is now available free of charge at The Alliance for the Implementation of Clinical Practice Guidelines. This site will begin uploading more current references in April 2020.

Historically, it had been maintained as a public resource by the Agency for Healthcare Research and Quality (AHRQ) of the U.S. Department of Health and Human Services. The NGC aimed to provide physicians, nurses, and other health professionals, health care providers, health plans, integrated delivery systems, purchasers and others an accessible mechanism for obtaining objective, detailed information on clinical practice guidelines and to further their dissemination, implementation and use. The database was updated weekly with new and revised guidelines. The currency of all guidelines was verified annually through NGC's Annual Verification process.

The site featured:
A Guideline Comparison utility that gives users the ability to generate side-by-side comparisons for any combination of two or more guidelines 
Guideline Syntheses prepared by NGC staff, comparing guidelines covering similar topics, highlighting areas of similarity and difference. NGC Guideline Syntheses often provide a comparison of guidelines developed in different countries, providing insight into commonalities and differences in international health practices. 
An electronic forum, NGC-L for exchanging information on clinical practice guidelines, their development, implementation and use 
An Annotated Bibliography database where users can search for citations for publications and resources about guidelines, including guideline development and methodology, structure, evaluation, and implementation.

See also
ECRI Institute
U.S. Food and Drug Administration (FDA)

References

External links
 NGC Website
 NGC Announcements
 Galician Health Technology Assessment Agency published a Spanish user-guide about National Guideline Clearinghouse
  ECRI Guidelines Trust

United States Department of Health and Human Services